Darlipali Super Thermal Power Station at Darlipali village in Sundargarh district in Indian state of Odisha. The power plant is one of the coal based power plants of NTPC Limited. Coal will be obtained from Dulanga and Pakri Barwadih Coal Block and water supply will be sourced from the Hirakund Reservoir on the Mahanadi River
through a pipeline at over a distance of about 30.0 km from project site. Plant is under construction by Bharat Heavy Electrical Limited (BHEL), L&T Power.

Capacity
Its planned capacity of 1600 MW (2x800 MW).

References

Coal-fired power stations in Odisha